The NCAA Division I men's soccer tournament, sometimes known as the College Cup, is an American intercollegiate soccer tournament conducted by the National Collegiate Athletic Association (NCAA), and determines the Division I men's national champion. The tournament has been formally held since 1959, when it was an eight-team tournament. Since then, the tournament has expanded to 48 teams, in which every Division I conference tournament champion is allocated a berth. Among the most successful programs, Saint Louis won 10 titles during dynasty years between 1959 and 1973. Indiana has won 8 titles beginning in 1982, whereas Virginia has won 7 titles beginning in 1989. Syracuse won its first national title in its first appearance in 2022.

Although the tournament is frequently referenced as the "College Cup", the NCAA applies the title only to the semifinal and championship rounds of the tournament proper. Since the tournament began, the semifinal and final fixtures have been held at a neutral site predetermined by the NCAA prior to the start of the regular season.

Format 

The NCAA Division I men's soccer tournament is a 48-team, single-elimination tournament. Currently, 22 spots are reserved for the winners of automatic bids.

As of the next NCAA men's soccer season in 2023, the following conferences are expected to be granted automatic qualification: 

 America East
 American Athletic
 ASUN
 Atlantic Coast
 Atlantic 10
 Big East
 Big South
 Big Ten
 Big West
 Colonial Athletic Association
 Horizon League
 Ivy League
 Metro Atlantic
 Missouri Valley
 Northeast
 Pac-12
 Patriot League
 Southern
 Summit League
 Sun Belt
 West Coast
 Western Athletic

Each conference determines the format for its conference championship, which determines the school that receives its automatic bid. Many use conference tournaments, although three conferences award the championship and automatic bid to the regular-season champion. The remaining 26 teams receive at-large bids. The at-large teams are selected by a committee consisting of representatives from each of the eight regions the NCAA has divided the country into. The committee uses a number of criteria, the most influential supposedly being the Ratings Percentage Index, a mathematical formula designed to objectively compare the results and strength of schedule of all Division I teams.

The top 16 teams are seeded into the bracket and receive first round byes. The other 32 are grouped by geographical proximity. The first four rounds are played on campus sites, with matches being hosted by the higher seed. The College Cup, comprising the semifinal and final matches, is played at a predetermined site.

Syracuse is the current champion, defeating Indiana 7–6 on penalties following a 2–2 draw after extra time in the 2022 final.

List of champions 
Below is a complete list of winning teams and finals held:

Notes

Most successful schools

Team titles 

Notes

Appearances

This list consists of the top 25 men's college soccer teams in terms of appearances in the NCAA Division I Men's Soccer Championship.

See also
List of NCAA Division I men's soccer programs
NCAA Men's Division I Soccer Tournament appearances by school
NCAA Division II Men's Soccer Championship
NCAA Division III Men's Soccer Championship
 NCAA Women's Soccer Championship
 NAIA national men's soccer championship
Intercollegiate Soccer Football Association (ISFA) – declared the annual national champion (1927–1958)
Intercollegiate Association Football League (IAFL) – declared the annual national champion (1911–1926)
Pre-NCAA Soccer Champions

Highest attendances 
The highest recorded attendance for championship games are listed below:
22,512 – Saint Louis (5) vs. SIU Edwardsville (1), Busch Stadium, St. Louis Oct. 30 1980
21,319 – Wisconsin (1) vs. Portland (0) / Duke (3) vs. Virginia (2), Richmond, Virginia (NCAA semifinals) Dec. 8, 1995
20,874 – St. John's (NY) (4) vs. FIU (1), Richmond, Virginia (NCAA final) Dec. 15, 1996
20,703 – Wisconsin (2) vs. Duke (0), Richmond, Virginia (NCAA final) Dec. 10, 1995
20,269 – St. John's (NY) (2) vs. Creighton (1) / FIU (4) vs. Charlotte (0), Richmond, Virginia (NCAA semifinals) Dec. 13, 1996
20,143 – UCLA (2) vs. Virginia (0), Richmond, Virginia (NCAA final) Dec. 14, 1997
20,112 – Saint Louis (1) vs. SIU Edwardsville (0), Busch Stadium, St. Louis Nov. 9, 1973
Numbers in parenthesis indicate goals scored by participating teams.

References

External links
 

 
1959 establishments in the United States
Recurring sporting events established in 1959